Ramsay/Inglewood is a planned and approved CTrain light rail station in Calgary, Alberta, Canada part of the Green Line. Construction will begin in 2022 and complete in 2027 as part of construction stage one, segment one. The station serves some of Calgary's oldest, most historic areas located in the urban inner-city communities of Ramsay and Inglewood.

The station will be an "elevated bridge” over 11 Street SE and parallel to the CP Rail bridge. There will be an at-grade access on the west side from Jefferies Park, and an elevated access on the east end. As part of the station's construction, 11 Street SE will be converted into a pedestrian-friendly main street with transit oriented development. The main street will span southward from Ramsay/Inglewood Station to 26 Avenue SE, where 26 Avenue SE Station will be the main street's southern anchor. There will be no direct transit connections from the station and no park and ride.

To make way for construction in 2022, enabling works projects are currently underway in the community. These projects include utility relocation, land preparation and environmental remediation. Additionally, CP Rail is relocating freight railway track and removing abandoned track along the west side of the station.

References 

CTrain stations
Railway stations scheduled to open in 2027